Aching Heart is a Swedish documentary film about the world of young European Muslims who dedicate themselves to jihad, or holy war. It was nominated by the Swedish Film Institute for the 43rd Guldbagge Awards in the category of Best Documentary Feature.

The film includes the story of "two young Swedes with immigrant backgrounds - one from Ostermalm, one of Stockholm's poshest neighborhoods, and one from Kvanum, a tiny town in central Sweden - who left their homes in the 1990s to seek martyrdom in the wars of Chechnya and Bosnia and Herzegovina."

Oscar Hedin, the director and writer of the film received support from academics who have studied the phenomenon of Islamic radicalisation.

See also
 Islamic terrorism

Related documentaries
 Al-Qaeda's New Front
 Islam: What the West Needs to Know

References

External links
 Official website
 
 
 

2007 films
Swedish documentary films
Documentary films about jihadism
Swedish-language films
Films shot in Sweden
2007 documentary films
Islam in Sweden
2000s Swedish films